Lawtell is an unincorporated community and census-designated place in St. Landry Parish, Louisiana, United States. The name is a portmanteau of the names of its two founders: Lawler and Littell.

State Representative Dustin Miller is a native of and a businessman in Lawtell.

Geography
U.S. Route 190 passes through the community.

Demographics

As of the 2010 United States Census, there were 1,198 people living in the CDP. The racial makeup of the CDP was 49.6% Black, 45.1% White, 0.2% Native American, 0.2% Asian, 1.2% from some other race and 1.4% from two or more races. 12.4% were Hispanic or Latino of any race.

References

Census-designated places in St. Landry Parish, Louisiana
Census-designated places in Louisiana